Santiago Álvarez is a Spanish writer, musician and theatre practitioner. He was born in Murcia in 1973. He has published a number of short stories and two novels: La Ciudad de la Memoria (2015) and El Jardín de Cartón (2016). He has also written, directed and acted in stage plays and musicals, and recorded several albums. He is a specialist in the history of Valencia. He is also regarded as the first tutor in Spain of Scrivener, the software programme for writers.

References

Spanish writers
1973 births
Living people
Date of birth missing (living people)